The Hoher Hagen is a volcanic hill that is still 480 m high today, in the Dransfeld Municipal Forest, in the German district of Göttingen in South Lower Saxony.

Geography 
The hill, which is located south of Dransfeld, is the highest point in the Dransfeld region by a long way. It lies within the Dransfeld Municipal Forest, a hill massif in the  Münden Nature Park that is about halfway between Göttingen to the northeast and Hann. Münden to the southwest.

Gauß Tower 

Sources 
 Rehkop, Friedel: Stadt Dransfeld. Ein geschichtlicher Rückblick vom 19. Jahrhundert bis zur Frühzeit. Vol. 1. Horb am Neckar: Geiger-Verlag, 1999. S.196-200,352-360,387-397.

References

External links 
 Further information about the Hoher Hagen
 School hall of residence and educational establishment on the Hoher Hagen
 Information on the Gauss Tower on the Hoher Hagen
 Information on the Hasenmelkerlauf

Hills of Lower Saxony
Volcanoes of Germany